State Route 280 (SR-280) is a  state highway completely within Summit County in the northern portion of the U.S. state of Utah. SR-280 connects Interstate 80 (I-80) in Coalville to Main Street in the same town. The entirety of the highway is named 100 South.

Route description
The highway begins at a diamond interchange on I-80 at exit 162 west of the center of Coalville and heads northwest on a two-lane undivided highway. SR-280 enters downtown Coalville and terminates on Main Street.

History
Prior to the construction of I-80, SR-4 (US-189) passed through Coalville on Main Street. To retain access to the town once I-80 replaced the surface road, the State Road Commission designated State Route 280 in 1961 as a short connection between I-80 and Main Street on Icy Springs Road (100 South). Before serving its intended purpose, the road briefly formed part of SR-2 (which had replaced SR-4 in 1962) and US-189, since I-80 was completed west of SR-280 before the portion east to Echo opened. A temporary ramp left the right side of SR-280 where the ramp to I-80 east now begins, and curved left into the westbound lanes of I-80 just before the Interstate crosses under SR-280.

Major intersections

References

280
 280
Streets in Utah